Paolo Cherici is an Italian lutenist. He has given performances all around the world, taking part in ancient music festivals.

He studied the guitar under Ruggero Chiesa, later continuing with lute studies at the Schola Cantorum in Basel with Hopkinson Smith and Eugen M. Dombois.

Cherici has made a large number of recordings, and some have received the highest critical praise (Diapason d'Or du Siècle).

He teaches at the Milan Conservatory.

External links
 Official website

Living people
Italian lutenists
Musicians from Milan
Italian performers of early music
Schola Cantorum de Paris alumni
Year of birth missing (living people)